San Martín de la Vega del Alberche is a town and municipality located in the province of Ávila, Castile and León, Spain. According to the 2006 census (INE), the municipality had a population of 244 inhabitants. However in 2019 the town has experienced a decrease of inhabitants to 168. The Alberche River which has its source approximately 2 km's west of the town, passes through the lower part of the town before joining the Tagus River (Rio Tajo) just east of Talavera de la Reina. 

San Martin de la Vega del Alberche is located approximately 50 km by road (via N 502 and AV 510) from the provincial capital, and at 1,517 metres is the 4th highest, by altitude above sea level, in the province of Ávila and the 10th highest in Spain.  
Within easy reach of the Sierra de Gredos Regional Park the town is popular with summer holidaymakers, and day-trippers, looking to escape the heat of the Castillian meseta.  

A sample of things to see and do; visit the Church of San Martín, visit the ruins of the chapels (la ermita de los Dolores or de la Piedad), walk to the source of the Alberche River, take in the historical stone architecture.  
There are numerous spring water fountains scatted about the town where one can quench a thirst.

References

Municipalities in the Province of Ávila